Emilio Massino (16 November 1925 – 14 April 2013) was an Italian sailor who competed in the 1956 Summer Olympics.

References

External links
 

1925 births
2013 deaths
Italian male sailors (sport)
Olympic sailors of Italy
Sailors at the 1956 Summer Olympics – 12 m2 Sharpie